Llangwyllog railway station was situated on the Anglesey Central Railway line from Gaerwen to Amlwch. The single storey station building with ticket and waiting room was located on the Down (west) side and opened in 1865, the platform being extended in 1890. A small goods shed was located north of the main building. In 1914 a passing loop was installed at the station, the only one of the whole Anglesey Central line. Another platform was also installed in the year on the opposite side of the line which had a wooden shelter on it.

All stations on the Anglesey Central line closed to passengers in 1964 as part of the Beeching Axe although freight works continued until 1993. The line is still in situ but the goods track and the passing loop has been lifted. The station building itself is now privately owned.

References

Further reading

Disused railway stations in Anglesey
Beeching closures in Wales
Railway stations in Great Britain opened in 1865
Railway stations in Great Britain closed in 1964
Llanddyfnan
Former London and North Western Railway stations
1865 establishments in Wales
1964 disestablishments in Wales